Mid Valley Shopping Centre is a regional shopping centre in Morwell, Victoria, Australia. It is the largest shopping centre in Gippsland. The centre commenced trading on 7 September 1982  (after an opening ceremony the previous day), and has since been redeveloped between the late 1990s and mid-2000s. The centre has 67 stores, including a discount department store and two supermarkets, as well as a cinema complex and hardware Store (Bunnings Warehouse)

Opening 
Mid Valley was opened in 1982 on a site between the Princes Highway and the main Gippsland railway in Morwell's east. Mid Valley's opening in effect split the retail centre of Morwell in two.  Target and Safeway each operated large stores in the CBD and Mid Valley for several years, with both closing their CBD stores in the late 1980s/early 1990s.

At the time of opening the centre housed four majors: Safeway, Target, Venture, and McEwans.

Of the original tenants Safeway (now Woolworths), Tattslotto, Just Jeans, Katies, Sussan, and West Mall Newsagency (renamed Card Alley) now remain.

Expansions 
An extension was proposed in 2011 to allow for a further 15 tenants. This could be built on the car park on the west side of the bus terminal.

Major Stores
 Woolworths (formerly Safeway) - 13 Aisles, opened 1982
 Big W - Opened 2002
 Bunnings Warehouse - Opened 1997 outside the complex
 Cotton on Mega - Opened 2019
The Reject Shop
 Village Cinemas

Former major stores:
 Target - Opened 1982, closed June 2018 
Coles- Opened 2003, closed 2018
Dimmeys - Originally opened 1997, closed 2002; reopened 2018, closed 2022
 McEwans - Opened 1982, replaced by Bunnings Warehouse in 1997
 Venture - Opened 1982, closed mid-1990s
 Fosseys - Opened mid-1990s, closed 2001
 Brashs - Opened 1982, closed 1998

References

External links 
Mid Valley Shopping Centre official website

1982 establishments in Australia
Gippsland (region)
Shopping centres in Victoria (Australia)
Shopping malls established in 1982